Johan Pérez (born 10 June 1983) is a Venezuelan professional boxer. He is a former interim WBA Light welterweight champion.

Professional career

On December 10, 2011, Pérez defeated Fernando Castañeda by fourth round technical knockout for the interim WBA light welterweight title.

He would lose the title to Pablo César Cano before regaining it by defeating Paul Spadafora on November 30, 2013.

Professional boxing record 

| style="text-align:center;" colspan=8|22 Wins (15 knockouts, 7 decisions), 5 Losses, 2 Draw, 1 No Contest
|-  style="text-align:center; background:#e3e3e3;"
|  style="border-style:none none solid solid; "|Res.
|  style="border-style:none none solid solid; "|Record
|  style="border-style:none none solid solid; "|Opponent
|  style="border-style:none none solid solid; "|Type
|  style="border-style:none none solid solid; "|Rd., Time
|  style="border-style:none none solid solid; "|Date
|  style="border-style:none none solid solid; "|Location
|  style="border-style:none none solid solid; "|Notes
|-align=center
|Loss
|align=center|22-5-2-(1)||align=left| Fabián Maidana
|
|
|
|align=left|
|align=left|
|-align=center
|Loss
|align=center|22-4-2-(1)||align=left| Sadam Ali
|
|
|
|align=left|
|align=left|
|-align=center
|Win
|align=center|22-3-2-(1)||align=left| Esteban Alseco
|
|
|
|align=left|
|align=left|
|-align=center
|Win
|align=center|21-3-2-(1)||align=left| Jose Antonio Cervantes
|
|
|
|align=left|
|align=left|
|-align=center
|style="background: #B0C4DE"|Draw
|align=center|20-3-2-(1)||align=left| Pedro Verdu
|
|
|
|align=left|
|align=left|
|-align=center
|Loss
|align=center|20-3-1-(1)||align=left| Dmitry Mikhaylenko
|
|
|
|align=left|
|align=left|
|-align=center
|Win
|align=center|20-2-1-(1)||align=left| Humberto Mauro Gutiérrez
|
|
|
|align=left|
|align=left|
|-align=center
|Loss
|align=center|19-2-1-(1)||align=left| Mauricio Herrera
|
|
|
|align=left|
|align=left|
|-align=center
|Win
|align=center|19-1-1-(1)||align=left| Fernando Monte de Oca
|
|
|
|align=left|
|align=left|
|- align=center
|Win
|align=center|18-1-1-(1)||align=left| Paul Spadafora
|
|
|
|align=left|
|align=left|
|- align=center
|Win
|align=center|17-1-1-(1)||align=left| Yoshihiro Kamegai
|
|
|
|align=left|
|align=left|
|- align=center
|Win
|align=center|16-1-1-(1)||align=left| Steve Forbes
|
|
|
|align=left|
|align=left|
|- align=center
|Loss
|align=center|15-1-1-(1)||align=left| Pablo César Cano
|
|
|
|align=left|
|align=left|
|- align=center
|Win
|align=center|15-0-1-(1)||align=left| Fernando Castaneda
|
|
|
|align=left|
|align=left|
|- align=center
|Win
|align=center|14-0-1-(1)||align=left| Kenny Galarza
|
|
|
|align=left|
|align=left|
|- align=center
|style="background: #B0C4DE"|Draw
|align=center|13-0-1-(1)||align=left| Alberto Mosquera
|
|
|
|align=left|
|align=left|
|- align=center
|Win
|align=center|13-0-(1)||align=left| Noel Gomez
|
|
|
|align=left|
|align=left|
|- align=center
|Win
|align=center|12-0-(1)||align=left| Yader Polanco
|
|
|
|align=left|
|align=left|
|- align=center
|Win
|align=center|11-0-(1)||align=left| Gilbert Quiros
|
|
|
|align=left|
|align=left|
|- align=center
|Win
|align=center|10-0-(1)||align=left| Johnny Greaves
|
|
|
|align=left|
|align=left|
|- align=center
|Win
|align=center|9-0-(1)||align=left| Jose Miranda
|
|
|
|align=left|
|align=left|
|- align=center
|Win
|align=center|8-0-(1)||align=left| Azael Cosio
|
|
|
|align=left|
|align=left|
|- align=center
|style="background:#ddd;"|NC
|align=center|7-0-(1)||align=left| Azael Cosio
|
|
|
|align=left|
|align=left|
|- align=center
|Win
|align=center|7–0||align=left| Yonel Echenique
|
|
|
|align=left|
|align=left|
|- align=center
|Win
|align=center|6–0||align=left| Dunis Linan
|
|
|
|align=left|
|align=left|
|- align=center
|Win
|align=center|5–0||align=left| Franklin Arroyo
|
|
|
|align=left|
|align=left|
|- align=center
|Win
|align=center|4–0||align=left| Catalino Julio
|
|
|
|align=left|
|align=left|
|- align=center
|Win
|align=center|3–0||align=left| Vicente Seca
|
|
|
|align=left|
|align=left|
|- align=center
|Win
|align=center|2–0||align=left| Luis José León
|
|
|
|align=left|
|align=left|
|- align=center
|Win
|align=center|1–0|| align=left| Erwin Romero
|
|||
|align=left|
|align=left|

References

External links

 

!colspan="3" style="background:#C1D8FF;"| Regional championship
|-

1983 births
Living people
Venezuelan male boxers
Light-welterweight boxers
World Boxing Association champions
Sportspeople from Caracas